Robert Seiringer  (1 September 1976, Vöcklabruck) is an Austrian mathematical physicist.

Life and work
Seiringer studied physics at the University of Vienna, where in 1999 he acquired his diploma and in 2000 with Jakob Yngvason as thesis advisor attained a doctorate. In 2005 he attained his habilitation qualification at the University of Vienna. With a Schrödinger scholarship, he went in 2001 to Princeton University. There he became in 2003 assistant professor. Starting from 2010 he is an associate professor at McGill University. In addition he is extraordinarius professor at the University of Vienna. Seiringer made substantial progress in the mathematical theory of quantum gases and particularly Bose–Einstein condensate (BEC). He partly proved the existence of BEC for interacting boson gases in the Gross–Pitaevskii limit in collaboration with Elliott Lieb. They proved also superfluidity in this limit and derived the Gross–Pitaevskii equation in the special case of BEC in rotating containers. Since 2013 he is a full professor at the Institute of Science and Technology Austria (ISTA) in Klosterneuburg, Austria.

Recognition
In 2009 Seiringer received the Henri Poincaré Prize. 

He was elected as a Fellow of the American Mathematical Society in the 2020 Class, for "contributions to mathematical physics and analysis in many-body quantum physics, and for service to the mathematical community".

Works

Sources
 Laudatio by Yngvason on the Poincaré Prize für Seiringer, pdf file

References

External links
 Website at McGill University
 Zum Poincare-Preis für Seiringer, Universität Wien 2009

Austrian physicists
1976 births
Living people
Fellows of the American Mathematical Society
Presidents of the International Association of Mathematical Physics